William Thomas Proctor (1896 – 13 January 1967) was a Labour Party politician in the United Kingdom.

Proctor worked as a railway guard, and was secretary of the Pontypool branch of the National Union of Railwaymen and was a member of the Monmouthshire County Council.

He was elected at the 1945 general election as Member of Parliament (MP) for Eccles, and held the seat until he retired from the House of Commons at the 1964 election.

References

External links 
 

1896 births
1967 deaths
Labour Party (UK) MPs for English constituencies
National Union of Railwaymen-sponsored MPs
UK MPs 1945–1950
UK MPs 1950–1951
UK MPs 1951–1955
UK MPs 1955–1959
UK MPs 1959–1964